Fernando da Silva Jaques (born January 12, 1980), known as Fernando Gaúcho, is a Brazilian former footballer who played as a striker. He was Guarani's top goalscorer on the 2008 Campeonato Brasileiro Série C, having scored 17 goals in 21 matches.

Honours
 Campeonato Brasileiro Série C: 2003
 Campeonato Paulista: 2002
Torneio Ângelo Dosseana: 2001
Copa Mauro R. de Oliveira: 2002

References

1980 births
Living people
Footballers from Porto Alegre
Brazilian footballers
Brazilian expatriate footballers
Expatriate footballers in Portugal
Campeonato Brasileiro Série A players
Campeonato Brasileiro Série B players
Campeonato Brasileiro Série C players
Primeira Liga players
Sociedade Esportiva e Recreativa Caxias do Sul players
Grêmio Foot-Ball Porto Alegrense players
Ituano FC players
F.C. Paços de Ferreira players
Paraná Clube players
Comercial Futebol Clube (Ribeirão Preto) players
Esporte Clube Noroeste players
Guarani FC players
Rio Claro Futebol Clube players
Criciúma Esporte Clube players
São José Esporte Clube players
Associação Atlética Caldense players
Campinense Clube players
Santa Cruz Futebol Clube players
Guarany Sporting Club players
Araxá Esporte Clube players
Sport Club Atibaia players
Esporte Clube Avenida players
Anápolis Futebol Clube players
Clube Atlético Taboão da Serra players
Clube Esportivo Bento Gonçalves players
Association football forwards